Christoph Heyder (born 3 June 1974 in Suhl) is a German bobsledder who has competed since 1997. He won a silver medal in the four-man event at the 2004 FIBT World Championships in Königssee.

Heyder also finished fifth in the four-man event at the 2006 Winter Olympics in Turin.

References
 Bobsleigh four-man world championship medalists since 1930
 FIBT profile
 

1974 births
Living people
People from Suhl
German male javelin throwers
German male bobsledders
Bobsledders at the 2006 Winter Olympics
Olympic bobsledders of Germany
Sportspeople from Thuringia
21st-century German people